David Mamievich Degtyarev (born 12 June 1996) is a Kazakh Paralympic powerlifter. He won the gold medal in the men's 54 kg event at both the 2020 Summer Paralympics held in Tokyo, Japan and the 2021 World Para Powerlifting Championships held in Tbilisi, Georgia.

Career 

In 2017, he finished in 7th place in the men's 54 kg event at the World Para Powerlifting Championships held in Mexico City, Mexico. At the 2019 World Para Powerlifting Championships held in Nur-Sultan, Kazakhstan, he finished in 5th place in the men's 49 kg event.

He won the gold medal in the men's 54 kg event at the 2020 Summer Paralympics held in Tokyo, Japan. It was the first gold medal won by a powerlifter representing Kazakhstan at the Paralympics. A few months later, he won the gold medal in his event at the 2021 World Para Powerlifting Championships held in Tbilisi, Georgia.

In December 2022, at the Para Powerlifting World Cup in the UAE, he won a gold medal, conquering the weight of 175 kg. In the sum of three approaches, gaining 510 kg, David won the second gold medal of the tournament.

Results

References

External links 
 

Living people
1996 births
People from Akmola Region
Powerlifters at the 2020 Summer Paralympics
Medalists at the 2020 Summer Paralympics
Paralympic medalists in powerlifting
Paralympic gold medalists for Kazakhstan
Kazakhstani male weightlifters
Paralympic powerlifters of Kazakhstan
Sportspeople with dwarfism
21st-century Kazakhstani people